Maria Ugolkova (born 18 July 1989) is a Swiss swimmer specializing in the 200 metres medley. She currently represents Switzerland while competing as well as the SCUW club, based near Zurich, Switzerland.

Career
Ugolkova holds multiple Swiss Swimming National Records, including the 200 Freestyle, 200 Backstroke, 100 Butterfly, 100 Medley, 200 Medley, and many more relay records both in short course pools and long course pools. She also holds multiple Swiss Championship Records, Swiss Team Championship Records, French-speaking Region Swiss Records, and Central-east german-speaking Region Swiss Records.

She participated at the 2016 Rio Summer Olympics, swimming the women's 4x100m freestyle relay, 100m freestyle, and 200m individual medley, representing the Swiss Olympic Team.

She also swam in the 200m individual medley at the 2018 European Championships in Glasgow, and came third during the final, swimming a time of 2:10.83. First place went to Katinka Hosszú from Hungary and second went to Ilaria Cusinato of Italy.

Awards and honours
 FINA, Top 10 Moments: 2021 Swimming World Cup (#8)

References

External links
 

1989 births
Living people
Swiss female backstroke swimmers
Swiss female butterfly swimmers
Swiss female freestyle swimmers
Swiss female medley swimmers
Olympic swimmers of Switzerland
Swimmers at the 2016 Summer Olympics
Swimmers from Moscow
Swiss people of Russian descent
European Aquatics Championships medalists in swimming
European Championships (multi-sport event) bronze medalists
Swimmers at the 2020 Summer Olympics
21st-century Swiss women